The Berlin Street Circuit is a  street circuit located along the Karl-Marx-Allee in Berlin, Germany. It is used for the Berlin ePrix of the single-seater, electrically powered Formula E championship. It was only used on 21 May 2016 during the 2016 Berlin ePrix.

References

Formula E circuits
Berlin ePrix
Motorsport venues in Berlin
Sports venues in Berlin
Defunct motorsport venues in Germany